This is a list of the butterflies of family Pieridae, or the "whites", which are found in Europe. It is a part of List of the butterflies of Europe.

Pieridae – whites
Subfamily Dismorphiinae
Wood white, Leptidea sinapis (Linnaeus, 1758)
Réal's wood white, Leptidea reali Reissinger, 1989
Leptidea juvernica Williams, 1946
Fenton's wood white, Leptidea morsei (Fenton, 1881)
Eastern wood white, Leptidea duponcheli (Staudinger, 1871)
 
Subfamily Coliadinae
Berger's clouded yellow, Colias alfacariensis Ribbe, 1805
Clouded yellow, Colias croceus (Fourcroy, 1785)
Northern clouded yellow, Colias hecla Lefèbvre, 1836
Pale clouded yellow, Colias hyale (Linnaeus, 1758)
Eastern pale clouded yellow, Colias erate (Esper, 1805)
Pale Arctic clouded yellow, Colias palaeno (Linnaeus, 1761)
Mountain clouded yellow, Colias phicomone (Esper, 1780)
Greek clouded yellow, Colias aurorina Herrich-Schäffer, 1850
Lesser clouded yellow, Colias chrysotheme Esper, 1781
Booth's sulphur, Colias tyche (de Böber, 1812)
Balkan clouded yellow, Colias caucasica Staudinger, 1871
Danube clouded yellow, Colias myrmidone Esper, 1780
African migrant, Catopsilia florella (Fabricius, 1775)
Cleopatra, Gonepteryx cleopatra (Linnaeus, 1767)
Common brimstone, Gonepteryx rhamni (Linnaeus, 1758)
Powdered brimstone, Gonepteryx farinosa (Zeller, 1847)
Canary Island brimstone, Gonepteryx cleobule (Hübner, 1824) Endemic to Canary Islands   
Gonepteryx eversi Rehnelt, 1974 Endemic to Canary Islands  

Subfamily Pierinae
Orange tip, Anthocharis cardamines (Linnaeus 1758)
Eastern orange tip, Anthocharis damone Boisduval, 1836
Provence orange tip, Anthocharis euphenoides Staudinger, 1869
Grüner's orange tip, Anthocharis gruneri (Herrich-Schäffer, 1851)
Black-veined white, Aporia crataegi (Linnaeus, 1758)
Small orange tip, Colotis evagore (Klug, 1829)
Eastern dappled white, Euchloe ausonia (Hübner, 1804)
Western dappled white, Euchloe crameri Butler, 1869
Portuguese dappled white, Euchloe tagis (Hübner, 1804)
Corsican dappled white, Euchloe insularis (Staudinger, 1861) Endemic to Corsica and Sardinia    
Greenish black-tip, Euchloe charlonia (Donzel, 1842)
Spanish greenish black-tip, Euchloe bazae Fabiano, 1993 Endemic to Spain   
Eastern greenish black-tip, Euchloe penia (Freyer, 1805)
Green-striped white, Euchloe belemia (Esper, 1800)
Mountain dappled white, Euchloe simplonia (Boisduval, 1878) 
Large white, Pieris brassicae (Linnaeus, 1758)
Canary Islands large white, Pieris cheiranthi (Hübner, 1808)
Dark-veined white, Pieris bryoniae (Hübner, 1806)
Mountain small white, Pieris ergane (Geyer, 1828)
Southern small white, Pieris mannii (Mayer, 1851)
Green-veined white, Pieris napi (Linnaeus, 1758)
Small white, Pieris rapae (Linnaeus, 1758)
Krueper's small white, Pieris krueperi Staudinger, 1860
Lofty Bath white, Pontia callidice (Hübner, 1806)
Bath white, Pontia daplidice (Linnaeus, 1758)
Eastern Bath white, Pontia edusa (Fabricius, 1777)
Lesser Bath white, Pontia chloridice (Hübner, 1813)
Sooty orange tip, Zegris eupheme (Esper, 1805)

References

Higgins, L.G. & Riley, N.D. (1970). A Field Guide to the Butterflies of Britain and Europe. Collins 
Higgins, L.G., (1975). The Classification of European Butterflies. London, Collins, 320 pp. 
C Della Bruna, E Gallo, Valerio Sbordoni (2013). "Pieridae Part 1 Subfamily Pierinae, tribe Pierini (partim)". Guide to the Butterflies of the Palearctic Region. Volume: 31 Omnes Artes 
J. Grieshuber (2014). "Pieridae Part 2 Subfamily: Coliadinae, tribe: Coliadini" Guide to the Butterflies of the Palearctic Region. Volume: 17 Omnes Artes 
Gian Cristoforo Bozano, John G Coutsis, P Heřman, G Allegrucci, D Cesaroni, Valerio Sbordoni (2016). "Pieridae Part 3 Subfamily Coliadinae, Tribes Rhodocerini, Euremini, Coliadini, Genus Catopsilia & Subfamily Dismorphiinae". Guide to the Butterflies of the Palearctic Region. Volume: 19 Omnes Artes 
Kudrna O., Ed. Butterflies of Europe. Aula Verlag, Wiesbaden 8 volumes
Tshikolovets, V.V. Butterflies of Europe and Mediterranean Area. Tshikolovets, Kiev

See also
 List of butterflies of Europe (Nymphalidae)

 
Europe, Pieridae